Black Point is a point on the west side of Right Whale Bay, 1.4 nautical miles (2.6 km) south-southwest of Nameless Point on the north coast of South Georgia. Charted and named by DI personnel in 1930.

References

Geography of Antarctica